Kamil Čapkovič (born 2 June 1986) is a professional Slovak tennis player.  He was born in Michalovce, Slovak Republic.

Career
Čapkovič has spent most of his time on the Futures and Challenger circuits, where he has won several Futures titles.

Singles Titles

References

External links
 
 

1986 births
Living people
Slovak male tennis players
People from Michalovce
Sportspeople from the Košice Region